Stave Falls Dam is a dual-dam power complex on the Stave River in Stave Falls, British Columbia, Canada. The dam was completed in 1912 for the primary purpose of hydroelectric power production. To increase the capacity of Stave Lake, the dam was raised in 1925 and the Blind Slough Dam constructed in an adjacent watercourse  to the north, which was the site of the eponymous Stave Falls. In 2000, the dam's powerhouse was replaced after a four-year upgrade. The original Stave Falls powerhouse was once British Columbia's largest hydroelectric power source, and is a National Historic Site of Canada.

Background
The Stave Falls Dam was first visualized in the 1890s as hydroelectric development was becoming widespread. Exploiting the  drop of Stave Falls could produce hydroelectricity which could be sold to various customers. In 1895, Stave Lake Electric and Power Co. Ltd was given permission to study the falls for electricity production. In 1909, the Western Canada Power Company bought Stave Lake Electric and Power and began construction of the dam. The first generator went online in December 1911 and the second in January 1912. Generators three and fourth went online in 1916 and 1922, respectively. In 1921, British Columbia Electric Railway bought Western Canada Power and continued to develop the power plant. A fifth generator was installed after it was realized that additional water from a dam raise and a reservoir created by the Alouette Dam (in the Alouette River drainage just west) could increase power production. The Stave Falls Dam was raised in 1925 and the fifth generator was operational on 19 September 1925. In 1926, the Blind Slough Dam was completed to supplement the reservoir's new size and serve as a spillway. Alouette Dam was completed in 1928.

Beginning in 1995, the original power station underwent decommissioning and was replaced with a new powerhouse containing two Kaplan turbines. The project included the construction of a new power plant intake, power house, tailrace channel and penstocks. It was completed in January 2000 and increased the installed capacity of the power plant from 52.5 MW to 90 MW.

The old powerhouse currently serves as a tourist attraction known as the Stave Falls Visitor Centre. It features exhibits about the construction of the dam, hydroelectric generation, renewable and non-renewable resources, hydroelectric generation, human and natural heritage, and conservation.

Design

The Blind Slough Dam serves as a spillway which consists of 10 tainter gates and four sluice gates.

The dam's current powerhouse contains two 45 MW Kaplan turbines and generators for an installed capacity of 90 MW. The old decommissioned powerhouse at the base of the Stave Falls Dam contains five horizontal double-Francis turbine-generators. Included are three exciters, two of which were once driven by smaller Francis turbines. Generators one through four used two exciters while generator five used its own.

Operation
The Stave Falls Dam is part of the Alouette-Stave Falls-Ruskin Hydroelectric Complex. At the end of the tunnel is a penstock which feeds the 8 MW Alouette Powerhouse on the edge of Stave Lake.

See also

 BCER Stave Falls Branch
List of electrical generating stations in British Columbia

References

External links
Stave Falls Visitor Centre
Flickr gallery "Ruskin", Maple Ridge Community Association, which includes pictures of the powerhouse under construction

Dams in British Columbia
Gravity dams
Hydroelectric power stations in British Columbia
Dams completed in 1912
Museums in British Columbia
Science museums in Canada
Mission, British Columbia
1912 establishments in British Columbia
BC Hydro
Publicly owned dams in Canada